Uziel (or Usiel) is an archangel mentioned in some variants of 3 Enoch (but Ouza in others), in a variant of Sefer Raziel HaMalakh, in Johannes Trithemius's Steganographia, and in John Milton's Paradise Lost.

See also
 List of angels in theology

Citations 

 3Enoch

Footnotes 

Angels in Christianity
Angels in Judaism
Individual angels